Kim Tae-hyeong (born February 11, 1988), better known as Paul Kim is a South Korean singer-songwriter. He debuted in 2014 and has released two extended plays and two full-length albums, one in two parts: The Road (2017) and Tunnel (2018), and one also in two parts: Heart, One (2019) and Heart, Two (2020).

Early life
Born in South Korea, Kim lived in New Zealand for five years where he attended high school. He then went to an international school for his university education in Japan. Afterwards, he returned to South Korea to start his music career.

Discography

Studio albums

Extended plays

Singles

Collaborations

Soundtrack appearances

Filmography

Television shows

Web series

Web shows

Radio Shows

Theater

Awards and nominations

State honors

Notes

References

External links

Living people
South Korean male singers
1988 births